Michèle Perrein (30 October 1929 – 13 February 2010) was a French journalist and writer. She was the recipient of the Prix Interallié in 1984.

Biography 
Michèle Perrein, whose real surname was Barbe, was born in Gironde and studied at the Collège de La Réole, followed by two years at the Faculty of Law in Bordeaux.

Hélène Lazareff, director of the magazine Elle, found that her surname "Barbe" was difficult to wear, and thus she decided to take her mother's name "Perrein". Her work as a journalist led her to follow several trials, some of which she published articles about in Elle (Minou Drouet affair 1955) where she questioned the authenticity of Minou Drouet's works, or Paris Match (Patrick Henry affair).

Married to Jacques Laurent, with whom she maintained an indefectible friendship until his death, she divorced a few years later to follow her own way of novelist.

It was in her native Gironde that Michèle Perrein found inspiration for many of her literary works, including Le Buveur de Garonne and Les Cotonniers de Bassalane which are the best known, and recognized. As a dramatist, she had her play L'Hôtel racine, presented at the Comédie des Champs-Élysées. She was also co-author of the screenplay and dialogues of Henri-Georges Clouzot's film, The Truth. She also produced reports, surveys, interviews or chronicles for Combat, Elle, Arts et Spectacles, Votre beauté and wrote some articles for Paris Match, Marie Claire, .

After the sudden death of her companion Michel Adam, called Adam Thalamy (with whom she co-wrote Ave Caesar in 1982), she ceased her activity as novelist and retired to the city of her childhood, where she was carried away by Alzheimer's disease.

Work 
Novels
1956: La Sensitive, Éditions Julliard, Prix des quatre Jurys 1957
1957: Le Soleil dans l’œil, Julliard, adapted to cinema under the title Sun in Your Eyes directed by Jacques Bourdon, starring Anna Karina
1960: Barbastre, Julliard
1961: La Flemme, Julliard
1962: Le Cercle, Julliard
1965: Le Petit Jules, Juliard
1970: M'oiselle S., Julliard
1970: La Chineuse, Julliard, Grand prix des lectrices de Elle
1971: La Partie de plaisir, Flammarion
1973: Le Buveur de Garonne, Flammarion, Prix des libraires 1974
1975: Le Mâle aimant, Julliard
1976: Gemma Lapidaire, Flammarion
1978: Entre chienne et louve, Éditions Grasset
1980: Comme une fourmi cavalière, Grasset
1982: Ave Caesar - rencontre avec Adam Thalamy, Grasset, Grand prix de littérature de la ville de Bordeaux, 1982
1984: La Sensitive ou l'innocence coupable, Grasset
1984: Les Cotonniers de Bassalane, Grasset, Prix Interallié 1984.
1989: La Margagne, Grasset

Plays
1966: L'Hôtel Racine jouée à la Comédie des Champs élysées
1968: Un samedi, deux femmes

References

External links
Michèle Perrein on Babelio
 Michèle Perrein ou madame Ex, féministe on INA.fr (13 August 1976)
 Un quart d'heure avec Michèle Perrein on France Culture
 La mort de Michèle Perrein on Bibliobs (10 March 2010)
 Disparition: Michèle Perrein on LivresHebdo.fr (10 March 2010)
 Michèle Perrein on Radio Télévision Suisse (11 October 1973)

20th-century French writers
20th-century French journalists
French women novelists
Prix Interallié winners
Prix des libraires winners
People from Gironde
1929 births
2010 deaths
20th-century French women